Juan Pedro Berga Garzón (born 6 March 1990 in Palma, Majorca), commonly known as Juanpe, is a Spanish footballer who plays as a forward.

References

External links

1990 births
Living people
Footballers from Palma de Mallorca
Spanish footballers
Association football forwards
Segunda División B players
Tercera División players
UD Alzira footballers
Real Balompédica Linense footballers
CD Llosetense players
CD Atlético Baleares footballers
CE Constància players
Slovak Super Liga players
1. FC Tatran Prešov players
MFK Zemplín Michalovce players
Spanish expatriate footballers
Expatriate footballers in Slovakia
Spanish expatriate sportspeople in Slovakia